Drymoptila is a genus of moths in the family Geometridae.

Species
 Drymoptila temenitis Guest, 1887

References
 Drymoptila at Markku Savela's Lepidoptera and Some Other Life Forms
 Natural History Museum Lepidoptera genus database

Ennominae
Geometridae genera